東海 or 东海  means "East Sea" or "Eastern Sea" in Chinese characters.

In Chinese, it may refer to:
 East China Sea, a marginal sea east of China
 East Sea (Chinese literature), one of the Four Seas, a literary name for the boundaries of China
 Tunghai University, a university in Taiwan

In Japanese, it may refer to:
 Tōkai region, a subregion of Chūbu facing the Pacific Ocean
 Tōkai, Ibaraki, a village in Ibaraki, Japan
 Tōkai, Aichi, a city in Aichi, Japan
 Tōkai University, a university in Tokyo, Japan
 Tōkai Gakki, a Japanese guitar manufacturer
 Tōkai (train), a train service

In Korean hanja, it may refer to:
 Sea of Japan, a marginal sea of the western Pacific Ocean, bordered by Japan, Korea and Russia
 Donghae, Gangwon, a city in Gangwon, South Korea
 Donghae (singer), a member of the Korean music group Super Junior

See also
 East Sea (disambiguation)
 Donghae (disambiguation), Korean pronunciation
 Tōkai (disambiguation), Japanese pronunciation
 Tunghai (disambiguation), Mandarin pronunciation

ko:동해 (동음이의)